Gerardo Emilio San Clemente Zárate (1818 Remedios, Antioquia - 1880 Barcelona) was a photographer and painter from Colombia. He studied in Bogotá under Barón Gros. He also studied painting at the Academia de Dibujo y Pintura in Medellín. He travelled to Spain, France, and the U.S.A.

References

Colombian photographers